Nandian (南甸镇) may refer to the following locations in China:

 Nandian, Hebei
 Nandian, Liaoning, in Benxi Manchu Autonomous County